Guilty Pleasures is a 2009 Nigerian drama film directed by Desmond Elliot and Daniel Ademinokan, starring Ramsey Nouah, Majid Michel and Nse Ikpe Etim. It was nominated for Best Screenplay at the 6th Africa Movie Academy Awards.

Cast
 Ramsey Nouah as Terso
 Majid Michel as Bobby
 Nse Ikpe Etim as Liz
 Mercy Johnson as Boma
 Omoni Oboli as Nse
 Desmond Elliot as Mr Okoro
 Rukky Sanda as Chidinma
 Beverly Naya as Bella

Reception
Nollywood Reinvented gave it a rating of 3 out of 5 stars, commended the actors in the film and noted the plot had both derivative aspects and some originality. Joy Isi Bewaji of Nigeria Entertainment Today praised the interpretation of roles by the top cast actors and described the plot as "subtly unravelling".

See also
 List of Nigerian films of 2009

References

2009 films
English-language Nigerian films
Nigerian drama films
2009 drama films
2000s English-language films